Mangal Singh Hazowary is an Indian Bodo language poet. He is recipient of Sahitya Akademi Award for his poetry "Ziuni Mwkthang Bisombi Arw Aroj" in 2005. The Government of India awarded him the fourth highest civilian honour of the Padma Shri, in 2021, for his contributions to literature and education.

References

1954 births
Living people
Recipients of the Padma Shri in literature & education
Recipients of the Sahitya Akademi Award in Bodo
Indian male poets
People from Assam